National symbols of Peru are the symbols that are used in Peru to represent what is unique about the nation, reflecting different aspects of the cultural life and history. The national symbols of Peru are established by law and part of the Political Constitution of Peru (Article 49).

Official symbols
The official symbols of Peru are established by law and part of the Political Constitution of Peru (Article 49).

Unofficial symbols

Peruvian icons
Icons of Peruvian culture.

See also
 List of national animals
 List of national anthems
 List of national birds
 List of national flowers

References